The RTÉ Libraries  and Archives are a collection of photographs, sounds recordings, video footage and written records (of articles such as scripts) in various formats across a wide range of topics pertaining to Irish life and society.

The collection is derived from the material used by Raidió Teilifís Éireann in their activities as national broadcaster for Ireland.
As RTÉ is part funded by a licence fee from Irish householders with televisions, it has a responsibility to maintain and update this collection and make it available to the general public.

In common with most broadcasters, much of RTÉ's early material was never recorded, with tapes wiped for re-use or simply dumped. The remaining footage largely consists of random extracts, rather than complete series. However, they provide insightful examples of historical programming.

During Christmas 2021 much more footage of clips, news, sports and programmes were added to mark 60 years of television. On Thursday December 1st 2022 new look "Collections" were added adding more through the years more room for news reports and programmes from yesteryear bigger things to happen from 2024 on words. In the 2nd half of 2023 no more Century Ireland.

Logo

The RTÉ Archives logo incorporates RTÉ current corporate logo with a take on the 1967 corporate logo for the word archive. There are two versions of the logo, generally the first letter of the word Archive is used (as see in description box) but also where the full word is used.

See also
 Reeling in the Years
 TV50

References

History of broadcasting
Libraries and Archives
Television archives